Olga Nikolayevna Naumenko (born December 6, 1949, Moscow, USSR) is a Soviet and Russian actress of theater and cinema, and a TV presenter, People's Artist of Russia (2005). Actress of Gogol Center.

A native of Moscow, Olga Naumenko, was born and grew up in a large family of a lieutenant-colonel and a housewife. The first years of her life were spent in Germany.

She was the spouse of actor Aleksandr Skvortsov (1950-2009), actor of the Hermitage Theater. Their marriage lasted 32 years. Daughter Svetlana is a journalist.

Career

Selected filmography 
 Crossing the Threshold (1970) as Albina Savitskaya
 Shadows Disappear at Noon (1971) as  Varka Morozova
 Eternal Call (1973) as Manya's girlfriend
 The Irony of Fate (1975) as Galya
   Medicine Against Fear (1978) as Olga Ilinichna Panafidina
   Vladivostok, 1918 (1982) as Loginova

Theater 
 Ugly Elsa (1983, directed by  Boris Golubovsky)
 Tired with Нappiness (2005,   Vyacheslav Sorokin)
 The Idiots (2013, Kirill Serebrennikov)
Ordinary Story (2015, Kirill Serebrennikov)
 Person (2016, Lera Surkova)

References

External links

1949 births
Living people
Actresses from Moscow
Soviet film actresses
Soviet stage actresses
Soviet television actresses
Russian film actresses
Russian stage actresses
Russian television actresses
Honored Artists of the RSFSR
People's Artists of Russia
20th-century Russian women